The Alstom Movia R151 is the upcoming seventh generation electric multiple unit rolling stock to be introduced on the existing North–South and East–West lines of Singapore's Mass Rapid Transit (MRT) system, manufactured by Changchun Alstom Railway Vehicles (joint venture of Alstom [formerly Bombardier Transportation] and CRRC Changchun, formerly Changchun Bombardier Railway Vehicles) under Contract R151 as part of their Movia family of trains. The new rolling stock will replace all of the C151s, C651s and C751Bs, which have been in service for at least 20 years. These new trains are part of the North–South and East–West lines' core systems upgrade and renewal programme.

106 six-car high-capacity trainsets comprising 636 cars will be delivered from 2022 onwards, entering service from 2023. The design of the trains will be completed in Germany, in coordination with Alstom's Singapore team. The trains will be manufactured in Alstom's Changchun facility in China.

With Alstom's agreement to acquire Bombardier's rail business in February 2021, it is not known as to whether there will be any changes in specifications to the R151 trains. There are currently 5 sets undergoing mainline testing, which are: 805/806, 809/810, 813/814, 815/816, and 823/824.

Overview
In October 2016, the Land Transport Authority (LTA) announced plans to replace the first-generation rolling stock on the North–South and East–West lines as part of an asset renewal programme for the two lines. The LTA awarded the contract for the replacement of the first-generation trains to Bombardier Transportation in July 2018, which comprised the provision of 66 new trains, and their maintenance and technical support.

On 1 April 2019, Bombardier Transportation and the LTA launched a mockup of the interior of the R151 at the SG Mobility Gallery at LTA's office at Hampshire Road.

In September 2020, the LTA ordered an additional 40 R151 trains at a cost of S$337.8 million, to replace all 19 second-generation C651 trains, and all 21 third-generation C751B trains, which had been in service for more than 20 years. These trains, and the ones ordered in 2018, were to be assembled by Bombardier in Changchun.

The first two trains arrived in Singapore on 21 February 2022, and the remaining trains will progressively be delivered. The trains will then undergo testing and commissioning works before entering passenger service in 2023.

Tender
The tender for trains under the contract R151 was closed on 4 September 2017 with 5 bids. The LTA had shortlisted all of them and the tender results were published.

Train formation
The configuration of a R151 in revenue service is DT–M1–M2+M2–M1–DT

Design and features
It will feature a new livery of green and red stripes against a black and white background running around the cars, similar to the C151C.
The trains also include several unique features, such as condition monitoring sensors and analytic systems to detect faults beforehand as well as an onboard self-test system that checks whether the train is fit for operation. In addition, four trains will have an automatic track inspection system, consisting of cameras, lasers and sensors, to detect rail defects.

Furthermore, the trains would also have wider areas near the doors to aid the movement of passengers in and out of the train, and tip-up seats that cater to parents with prams, wheelchair users and people with personal mobility devices or foldable bicycles without reducing seat count.

References

External links

Bombardier Transportation multiple units
Alstom multiple units
CRRC multiple units
Mass Rapid Transit (Singapore) rolling stock
750 V DC multiple units